Mother Goose and Grimm, also known as Grimmy for the second season, is an American animated television series that premiered September 14, 1991, on CBS. The show is an adaptation of Mike Peters's comic strip of the same name. The Saturday morning cartoon was produced by Bob Curtis, and written by Mark Evanier.

Cast
 Charlie Brill – Grimmy
 Greg Burson – Attila
 Eddie Deezen – Ham
 Mitzi McCall – Mother Goose
 Gregg Berger
 Jack Burns
 Frank Welker
 Hal Rayle
 Rob Paulsen
 Tress MacNeille
 Howard Morris
 Pat Harrington Jr.
 Hal Smith
 Charlie Adler
 Pat Musick
 Stan Freberg
 Danny Mann
 June Foray
 Steve DeVorkin
 Pete Barbutti

Episodes

Reception
Charles Solomon of the Los Angeles Times praised the series for "preserving the look" of the comic strip, and for "[having] a good sense of the characters' personalities", but was disappointed with the "flat timing and pedestrian direction" of the program.

References

External links

 

1990s American animated television series
1991 American television series debuts
1992 American television series endings
CBS original programming
Television shows based on comic strips
Television series by MGM Television
English-language television shows
Television series by Film Roman
American children's animated comedy television series
Television series by Claster Television